Abbott and Costello Meet Captain Kidd is a 1952 comedy film directed by Charles Lamont and starring the comedy team of Abbott and Costello, along with Charles Laughton, who reprised his role as the infamous pirate from the 1945 film Captain Kidd. It was the second film in SuperCineColor, a three-color version of the two-color Cinecolor process, and which utilized an Eastmancolor negative as Cinecolor did not offer three-color origination, only two-color origination via bipack.

Plot
On their way to their jobs at the Death's Head Tavern, Oliver "Puddin' Head" Johnson and Rocky Stonebridge encounter Lady Jane, who asks them to bring a love note to the tavern singer, Bruce Martingale.

At the tavern, the notorious Captain Kidd dines with Captain Anne Bonney, a female pirate. She complains that Kidd raided ships in her territory and demands her share of the treasure. Kidd informs Bonney that he has hidden the amassed treasure on Skull Island, and that he has the only map to its exact location. He agrees to take her, with her ship following close behind in the event of a double-cross. But as Oliver nervously waits on them, he inadvertently switches Lady Jane's love note with Kidd's map. Rocky discovers the mistake and negotiates with Kidd to take them along and share the treasure in exchange for the map. Kidd ostensibly agrees, but intends to kill Oliver and Rocky once he gets the map.

The voyage begins with the addition of Bruce, who has been shanghaied. Kidd unsuccessfully attempts to regain the map throughout the entire voyage. Meanwhile, Bonney mistakenly believes that Lady Jane's love note was written to Oliver, and becomes intrigued. During the voyage Kidd raids an English ship carrying Lady Jane, and kidnaps her.

When the ships reach Skull Island, Oliver and Rocky dig up the treasure. Kidd arrogantly declares his plans to dispose of them along with Captain Bonney. Bonney alerts the others to Kidd's true intentions, and signals her crew to attack. Bonney's crew wins the fight, the treasure is recovered, and Kidd becomes her prisoner.

Cast
 Bud Abbott as Rocky Stonebridge  
 Lou Costello as Oliver Johnson (alias Captain "Puddin' Head" Feathergill)
 Charles Laughton as Captain William Kidd 
 Hillary Brooke as Captain Bonney
 Bill Shirley as Bruce Martingale  
 Leif Erickson as Morgan  
 Fran Warren as Lady Jane

Production
Abbott and Costello Meet Captain Kidd was filmed from February 27 through March 25, 1952. Since Universal would not budget the extra money to make the film in color, the duo opted to do it themselves. Using a contractual agreement with Universal that permitted them to make one independent film per year, they made the film using Abbott's company, Woodley Productions (and their first color film, Jack and the Beanstalk, using Costello's company, Exclusive Productions).

Produced during a slump in Charles Laughton's career, the accomplished actor signed on to do the film for a mere $25,000. Shortly after filming was completed, on April 6, Abbott and Costello hosted an episode of the Colgate Comedy Hour and brought Laughton along as a guest. Later that year, the three of them filmed a two-minute commercial for Christmas Seals.

Re-release
The film was re-released in 1960 by RKO Pictures.

Routines
The Handcuff Scene, first used in Who Done It?, is used again in this film. In this version, Laughton as Captain Kidd demonstrates to Costello as Oliver how handcuffs should be worn by putting them on himself.

Home media
This film, along with Rio Rita, were released on DVD on April 1, 2011 by Warner Bros. on the WB Archive Collection.

References

External links

 
 
 
 

1952 films
1952 musical comedy films
American adventure comedy films
American musical comedy films
Abbott and Costello films
1950s English-language films
Films directed by Charles Lamont
Pirate films
Warner Bros. films
Cinecolor films
Cultural depictions of William Kidd
Cultural depictions of Anne Bonny
Films scored by Raoul Kraushaar
1950s American films